Allen Raine was the pseudonym of the Welsh novelist Anne Adalisa Beynon Puddicombe (6 October 1836 – 21 June 1908), who was born in Newcastle Emlyn. Her novels had sold more than two million copies by 1912.

Life
She was born Anne Adalisa Evans in Newcastle Emlyn, Carmarthenshire, the eldest daughter of a lawyer, Benjamin Evans, and Letitia Grace Evans, his wife, 
whose father was a lawyer and the grandson of David Davis (1745–1827). Allen Raine's mother was also the granddaughter of Daniel Rowland.

In 1849, she was sent to be educated with the family of a Unitarian minister, Henry Solly, at Cheltenham. The family included literati such as George Eliot, Mrs Henry Wood, and Bulwer-Lytton. She later lived in the suburbs of London with her sister Lettie. In her youth she published a short-lived periodical called Home Sunshine with the help of a few friends, which was printed at Newcastle Emlyn.

Marital life
Returning to Wales in 1856, she married the banker Beynon Puddicombe at Penbryn Church, Tresaith, Cardiganshire, on 10 April 1872. He was the foreign correspondent of Smith Payne's Bank, London. They lived in the London area until February 1900, when her husband became mentally ill. They then retired to Bronmôr, a house in Tresaith until his death in 1906. He died on 29 May and was buried at Penbryn Church.

She spent time in London for her education and marriage, but eventually returned to her Welsh roots. Wales features largely in her romantic fiction, with titles such as A Welsh Singer (1896) and A Welsh Witch (1902). She remained there until her death on 21 June 1908.

Works
Ynysoer (National Eisteddfod winner, 1894)
A Welsh Singer (1896)
Torn Sails (1897)
By Berwen Banks (1899)
Garthowen (1900)
A Welsh Witch (1902, republished by Honno Classics, 2013)
On the Wings of the Wind (1903)
Hearts of Wales (1905)
Queen of the Rushes (1906, republished by Honno Classics, 1998)
Neither Storehouse nor Barn (1908)
All in a Month (short story collection; 1908)
Where Billows Roll (originally Ynysoer, Eisteddfod winner 1894)
Under the Thatch  (unfinished at death, completed by Lyn Evans in 1910)

Films
Torn Sails (1915)
A Welsh Singer (starring Florence Turner 1915) and By Berwen Banks (1920)

Notes

References

Sally Roberts Jones, Allen Raine, 1979
Katie Gramich, Twentieth-Century Women's Writing in Wales: Land, Gender, Belonging, Cardiff: University of Wales Press, 2007.

External links
Allen Raine website

1836 births
1908 deaths
19th-century Welsh novelists
20th-century Welsh novelists
19th-century Welsh women writers
20th-century Welsh women writers
People from Carmarthenshire
Welsh short story writers
British women short story writers
Welsh women novelists
19th-century British short story writers
Pseudonymous women writers
19th-century pseudonymous writers
20th-century pseudonymous writers